Revesand is a village in Arendal municipality in Agder county, Norway.

References

Villages in Agder
Arendal